The Pazyryk culture ( Pazyrykskaya kul'tura) is  a Scythian nomadic Iron Age archaeological culture (6th to 3rd centuries BC) identified by excavated artifacts and mummified humans found in the Siberian permafrost, in the Altay Mountains, Kazakhstan and nearby Mongolia. The mummies are buried in long barrows (or kurgans) similar to the tomb mounds of Scythian culture in Ukraine. The type site are the Pazyryk burials of the Ukok Plateau.
Many artifacts and human remains have been found at this location, including the Siberian Ice Princess, indicating a flourishing culture at this location that benefited from the many trade routes and caravans of merchants passing through the area. The Pazyryk are considered to have had a war-like life. The Pazyryk culture was preceded by the "Arzhan culture" (Initial Scythian period, 8th - 7th century BC).

Archaeology

Other kurgan cemeteries associated with the culture include those of Bashadar, Tuekta, Ulandryk, Polosmak and Berel. There are so far no known sites of settlements associated with the burials, suggesting a purely nomadic lifestyle.

Because of a freak climatic freeze, some of the Altai burials, notably those of the 5th century BC at Pazyryk and neighbouring sites, such as Katanda, Shibe, and Tuekt, were isolated from external climatic variations by a protective layer of ice that conserved the organic substances buried in them. At Pazyryk these included the bodies of horses and an embalmed man whose body was covered with tattoos of animal motifs. The remarkable textiles recovered from the Pazyryk burials include the oldest woollen knotted-pile carpet known, the oldest embroidered Chinese silk, and two pieces of woven Persian fabric (State Hermitage Museum, St. Petersburg). Red and ochre predominate in the carpet, the main design of which is of riders, stags, and griffins. Many of the Pazyryk felt hangings, saddlecloths, and cushions were covered with elaborate designs executed in appliqué feltwork, dyed furs, and embroidery. Of exceptional interest are those with animal and human figural compositions, the most notable of which are the repeat design of an investiture scene on a felt hanging and that of a semihuman, semibird creature on another (both in the State Hermitage Museum, St. Petersburg). Clothing, whether of felt, leather, or fur, was also lavishly ornamented.

Horse reins either had animal designs cut out on them or were studded with wooden ones covered in gold foil. Their tail sheaths were ornamented, as were their headpieces and breastpieces. Some horses were provided with leather or felt masks made to resemble animals, with stag antlers or rams’ horns often incorporated in them. Many of the trappings took the form of iron, bronze, and gilt wood animal motifs either applied or suspended from them; and bits had animal-shaped terminal ornaments. Altai-Sayan animals frequently display muscles delineated with dot and comma markings, a formal convention that may have derived from appliqué needlework. Such markings are sometimes included in Assyrian, Achaemenian, and even Urartian animal representations of the ancient Middle East. Roundels containing a dot serve the same purpose on the stag and other animal renderings executed by contemporary Śaka metalworkers. Animal processions of the Assyro-Achaemenian type also appealed to many Central Asian tribesmen and are featured in their arts.

Certain geometric designs and sun symbols, such as the circle and rosette, recur at Pazyryk but are completely outnumbered by animal motifs. The stag and its relatives figure as prominently as in Altai-Sayan. Combat scenes between carnivores and herbivores are exceedingly numerous in Pazyryk work; the Pazyryk beasts are locked in such bitter fights that the victim's hindquarters become inverted.

Genetics

A 2015 study analyzed the DNA of two closely-related males from the Pazyryk culture. The two individuals were found to belong to the East Eurasian maternal haplogroup C4. Their paternal haplogroup was assigned to the East Eurasian haplogroup N. On the basis of both the maternal and paternal lineages, it was determined that the two individuals were extremely closely related, although it is also clear that they could not be father and son, suggesting some other variation of close kinship.

A 2017 study analyzed the maternal ancestry of several remains from the Pazyryk culture. 52% of these lineages were of East Eurasian origin, while 48% were of West Eurasian origin. The authors of this study also analyzed the paternal haplogroup of one Pazyryk male, who was determined to belong to the West Eurasian haplogroup R1a-Z93. With regards to autosomal population ancestry, around 50% of Pazyryk ancestry was related to East Asians, while the rest was related to West Eurasians.

See also
 Aldy-Bel culture
 Karasuk culture
 Pazyryk burials
 Tagar culture
 Tashtyk culture
 Scythians

References

Citations

Sources

External links

Nomadic Art of the Eastern Eurasian Steppes, an exhibition catalog from The Metropolitan Museum of Art (fully available online as PDF), which contains material on Pazyryk culture

Archaeological cultures of Siberia
Archaeological sites in Russia
Animals in art
Nomadic groups in Eurasia
Iranian archaeological cultures
Saka
Scytho-Siberian world
6th-century BC establishments

tr:Pazırık Kurganı